Abdulla Yaseen (born 6 October 1998) is a Bahraini handball player for Shabab and the Bahraini national team.

He represented Bahrain at the 2019 World Men's Handball Championship.

References

1998 births
Living people
Bahraini male handball players
21st-century Bahraini people